Mary Pitcaithly OBE is a Scottish civil servant who served as Chief Executive of Falkirk Council and the Convener of the Electoral Management Board for Scotland. The Scottish Independence Referendum Bill identifies the Convener of the Electoral Management Board for Scotland as the Chief Counting Officer for a referendum and thus she was Chief Counting Officer for the 2014 Scottish Independence Referendum.

Biography 
Pitcaithly was born in Camelon, Scotland and attended Falkirk High School before going to the University of Edinburgh where she studied law. She initially worked in private practice in Falkirk before joining the public sector in 1995, becoming assistant to Walter Weir, chief executive of the newly formed Falkirk Council. In 1998, she became the first woman to hold the post of chief executive in any of Scotland's 32 councils and, at 41, one of the youngest.

She is a former Chair of the Scottish Branch of the Society of Local Authority Chief Executives and Senior Managers and has represented local government on a number of national bodies, including the Resilience Advisory Board for Scotland. She is a former member of the Arbuthnott Commission set up to consider boundary differences and voting systems in Scotland.

Pitcaithly has been a Returning Officer since 1998 and has been involved with Scottish, UK and European Parliaments and Falkirk Council elections. She was a Depute Returning Officer for the Referendum held in Scotland in 1997 and was the Regional Counting Officer for Scotland in the 2011 United Kingdom Alternative Vote referendum.

Mary Pitcaithly received an OBE for services to local government in 2005.

She was married to the late Euan Pitcaithly, former chief photographer of The Falkirk Herald, and has a daughter.

References

Scottish civil servants
Scottish women in politics
People from Falkirk
Politics of Falkirk (council area)
Alumni of the University of Edinburgh
Officers of the Order of the British Empire
People educated at Falkirk High School
Living people
Year of birth missing (living people)